Pilumnus hirtellus, the bristly crab or hairy crab, is a species of European crab. It lives in shallow water and feeds on carrion.

Description
The carapace and legs are reddish brown or purple, with the inner surfaces of the legs orange or paler. Both the carapace and the walking legs have a dense covering of setae. The first pair of legs bear large chelae (claws), of which one, usually the right claw, is larger than the other, and the fingers of both claws are brown. The claws are smaller and less hairy in females. The front edge of the carapace has five teeth on either side, with the first two being smaller than the others.

Distribution
Pilumnus hirtellus is found from the North Sea to Morocco, the Azores, Madeira, the Canary Islands and the Cape Verde Islands, as well as in the Mediterranean and Black Seas. It is limited by the occurrence of hard frosts, violent storms and pollution.

Relatives
Pilumnus hirtellus is closely related to Pilumnus spinifer, and intermediates have been reported, although in other locations, the two species have been observed living in sympatry without any intermediates being observed.

Ecology
It can be found on various substrates, including muddy, sandy and rocky bottoms, under stones and even among the holdfasts of seaweeds. In the Black Sea, this species prefers stony areas with abundant algae and mussels. The diet consists mainly of carrion.

Life cycle
Between April and August, females may carry up to 4000 eggs. These are released between May and September, as planktonic zoea larvae, which develop into megalopa larvae before maturing into the adult form.

References

Pilumnoidea
Crustaceans of the Atlantic Ocean
Crustaceans described in 1761
Taxa named by Carl Linnaeus